Gumaga griseola is a species of bushtailed caddisfly in the family Sericostomatidae. It is found in North America.

References

Further reading

 
 
 
 

Integripalpia